Albano is an area in Stockholm, Sweden. It had been known as an industrial area during the 20th century but is now incorporated into the Stockholm University campus.

Albano used to have a railway station at Värtabanan with a connection to Roslagsbanan.

References 

Geography of Stockholm
Stockholm University